The Nature and Wildlife Discovery Center is a multi-campus nature preserve and educational center in Pueblo County, Colorado, United States. The NWDC is a 501 (c)(3) tax-exempt corporation which includes a  mountain park, lodge, gift shop, and museum in Beulah, a small museum and educational center as well as an open-space park on the Arkansas River in Pueblo, and an adjacent raptor education and rehabilitation facility.

The Nature and Wildlife Discovery Center offers access to two unique areas of Pueblo County. The NWDC's River Campus is located in Rock Canyon on the banks of the Arkansas River, and includes a blend of aquatic, riparian, transition, and semi-arid shortgrass prairie habitats. The Raptor Center is adjacent, just up the bluffs from the river. The NWDC Mountain Campus is located in Beulah, CO, offering visitors a blend of ponderosa pine and mixed fir forests as well as foothills transition habitats and access to the adjacent San Isabel National Forest.

The mission of the Nature and Wildlife Discovery Center is to provide a variety of outdoor experiences in education, conservation and recreation that appeal to all ages and enhance the quality of life in Pueblo County, as well as to foster environmental stewardship and an appreciation of natural habitats. In addition, the NWDC encourages self-directed outdoor activities at each of its locations, and welcomes residents and visitors alike to come enjoy the magic of Southern Colorado on its beautiful lands.

History

The Arkansas Valley Audubon Society founded the Audubon River Trails Nature Center in 1979 to preserve an area where people from Pueblo and the surrounding areas could observe, explore, and enjoy nature. In 1981, the Raptor Center was added. In 1983 the nature center incorporated as a 501 (c)(3) tax-exempt organization as "The Greenway and Nature Center of Pueblo." In 2008 the name was again changed to "Nature and Raptor Center of Pueblo."

Meanwhile, the Pueblo Mountain Park was operated as a property owned by the City of Pueblo, CO, which first purchased the land in 1920 at the behest of the San Isabel Public Recreation Association, itself inspire by the United States Forest Service visionary Arthur Carhart. During the aftermath of the Great Depression, crews from the Works Progress Administration (WPA) and Civilian Conservation Corps (CCC) constructed several facilities at the Mountain Park, including the original Horseshoe Lodge, the Pavilion, the Ballfield, and many road grades and bridges. As the 20th century wore on, the property went through periods of disuse, and at times the City of Pueblo considered selling it. In 1999, the Mountain Park Environmental Association was formed by a group of Pueblo citizens, with the intent of facilitating development of programs and access to the mountain park property. Since 2000, this organization, which became the Mountain Park Environmental Center and later merged with the Nature and Raptor Center of Pueblo to form the current Nature and Wildlife Discovery Center, has managed the park on behalf of the City of Pueblo, which retains ownership of the land.

"Mountain Park Environmental Center" and the "Nature and Raptor Center of Pueblo", which combined into one organization in early 2018. Previously, these organizations were known as the Pueblo Mountain Park and Greenway and Nature Center of Pueblo, respectively. They operate as the Nature and Wildlife Discovery Center (NWDC), and run a variety of programs at two campuses to engage the public with nature and expand access to natural spaces.

Facilities

The Nature and Wildlife Discovery Center hosts a wide variety of opportunities at its two campuses. The River Campus offers a blend of aquatic, riparian, transition, and semi-arid grassland habitats, and offers picnicking, wildlife viewing, fishing, kayaking, and nature walks, as well as access to the Pueblo River Trail System, Honor Farm Open Space Park, and the Pueblo Motorsports Park. Users may also access the Pueblo Whitewater Park, Valco Ponds and Lake Pueblo State Park from the trails adjacent to the River Campus.

The Raptor Center, which was founded in 1981 and forms part of NWDC's River Campus, specializes in rehabilitation of birds of prey. Injured and orphaned birds of prey from throughout southeastern Colorado are admitted to the facility and cared for with the hope that they can be returned to the wild. The Raptor Center hosts thousands of visitors annually, including out-of-town visitors, college students, K-12 students, and the interested public. Through a partnership with the Pueblo Zoo, some birds of prey which are unable to be successfully released are able to live at the zoo, providing educational opportunity for the public and a good life for the bird, who may not otherwise survive if released to the wild.

The Mountain Park Campus is located in beautiful Beulah, CO, just 25 miles and a 30-minute drive WSW of Pueblo on CO-78. Though close to town it is a world apart, offering access to miles and miles of trails, both within the park's  boundaries and on adjacent federal land owned and managed by the United States Forest Service as part of the San Isabel National Forest. The park also features Works Progress Administration-era construction of bridges and other structures, including the renovated Horseshoe Lodge, which hosts a small museum, gift shop, and overnight lodging to suit a variety of tastes. The park extends across a variety of ecosystems in the foothills transition zone, showcasing forests of ponderosa pine, Douglas fir, white fir, and juniper and oak shrublands.

Events

The Nature and Wildlife Discovery Center hosts the Colorado Owl Festival each fall, showcasing the variety of species present in our area with an eye toward education and fundraising for rehabilitation programs. Another annual event is the Raptor Resolution Run, a 5-mile run and 2.5 mile walk through Rock Canyon which kicks off with the release of a live raptor each December. In February, the Nature and Raptor Center along with Colorado Parks and Wildlife and the Pueblo Zoo team up to put on Eagle Days at the River Campus. In April, the Nature and Raptor Center puts together their annual Earth Day Events to honor their environmental heroes in the community. In November, NWDC hosts their annual fundraising breakfast.

Education

The Nature and Wildlife Discovery Center provides a wide variety of experiential education to local K-12 students, college and university students, interest groups, and the general public. There are Weekend Raptor Talks at 11:30am on Saturdays and Sundays at the River Campus, a monthly 4th Saturday Birdwalk (led by members of the Arkansas Valley Audubon Society) and full-day Summer Nature Camps for children entering Kindergarten to 12th grade. Registration for camps begins in March and continues through May.

Throughout the academic year, NWDC staff design and lead a signature environmental science program called Earth Studies, which uses the outdoor spaces at both campuses to teach concepts in the natural sciences. Students visit each campus a number of times and experience the seasons, the wildlife, the plants and the land across the year.

NWDC also operates an early-childhood preschool program called Earthkeeper Nature School. For children ages 4–7, it offers a progressive, nature-based curriculum at both campuses. Both the Earthkeeper Nature School and Earth Studies have received awards for excellent programming.

Students from Pueblo Community College and Colorado State University-Pueblo also visit NWDC's campuses to develop skills in outdoor education.

Conservation

Each year, the Raptor Center admits, rehabilitates and releases hundreds of injured, orphaned or otherwise compromised eagles, hawks, owls, falcons, vultures, and other birds of prey.

NWDC has partnered with Southern Colorado Trail Builders to design and construct the Carhart Trail, a multi-use trail at the Mountain Campus which connects to Squirrel Creek campground and trail system in the San Isabel National Forest. The Carhart trail is the first trail at the Mountain Campus accessible to mountain bikers as well as pedestrians and horseback riders. The Carhart Trail is named for Arthur Carhart, an early pioneer in the design of recreational access points for National Forest lands.

NWDC also hosts annual river cleanups at the River Campus, coordinating volunteers in cleaning the banks of the Arkansas River through Rock Canyon.

Notes

External links
 

Buildings and structures in Pueblo, Colorado
Nature centers in Colorado
Protected areas of Pueblo County, Colorado
Education in Pueblo County, Colorado
Wildlife rehabilitation and conservation centers
Tourist attractions in Pueblo, Colorado
Raptor organizations